Andrea Scicchitano (born 26 April 1992) is an Italian footballer who most recently played for Trastevere Calcio.

Biography
Born in Rome, capital of Italy and Lazio region, Scicchitano started his career at A.S. Roma. In 2010, he left for Sangiovannese in co-ownership deal. In June 2011 Roma gave up the remain 50% registration rights to Sangiovannese. However, the club also bankrupted. In 2011–12 season he was a player of San Marino and Pisa in the first half and second half respectively.

In 2012, he was signed by Siena as free agent. He was farmed to Poggibonsi in a temporary deal. In 2013, he was signed by Parma in a 3-year contract, but farmed to Ascoli immediately.

On 31 January 2014 he was signed by Pontedera.

After the bankruptcy of Parma, he was signed by Lega Pro newcomer Lupa Castelli Romani in a temporary deal from Latina.

On 30 August 2016 Scicchitano was signed by Lupa Roma from Crotone. Crotone signed him as a free agent in the same window.

References

External links
 AIC profile (data by football.it) 
 
 
 

Italian footballers
A.S. Roma players
A.S.D. Sangiovannese 1927 players
A.S.D. Victor San Marino players
Pisa S.C. players
A.C.N. Siena 1904 players
U.S. Poggibonsi players
Parma Calcio 1913 players
Ascoli Calcio 1898 F.C. players
U.S. Città di Pontedera players
A.C. Tuttocuoio 1957 San_Miniato players
Serie C players
Association football defenders
Footballers from Rome
1992 births
Living people